Warren Street Methodist Episcopal Church, also known as Warren Street United Methodist Church, is a historic Methodist church located at 201 South Warren Street in Warrensburg, Johnson County, Missouri. It was built in 1898–1899, and is a one-story, Late Gothic Revival style orange-tinted brick building.  It features a square entrance tower with a concave dome and a gabled cornice.  It was erected by a local African-American congregation.

It was listed on the National Register of Historic Places in 1996.

References

Methodist churches in Missouri
African-American history of Missouri
Churches on the National Register of Historic Places in Missouri
Gothic Revival church buildings in Missouri
Churches completed in 1899
Buildings and structures in Johnson County, Missouri
National Register of Historic Places in Johnson County, Missouri